Cheat food may refer to:

 Junk food – a synonym from the early 20th century
 Any food not on a diet, especially a weight-loss diet